Kyzyl-Kala, also Qyzyl Qala ("Red fortress"), in modern Karakalpakstan, Uzbekistan, was an ancient fortress in Chorasmia built in the 1st-4th century CE. The small fortress of Kyzyl-Kala is located near Toprak-Kala, about 1 km to the west, and was also built in the 1st-4th century CE, possibly as a fortified defense for the site of Toprak-Kala. Kyzyl-Kala was once restored in the 12th century CE. It has also been the subject of a modern renovation program, with the objective of showing what a fortress looked like originally. It is part of the "Fifty fortresses oasis" in modern-day Uzbekistan. It was last occupied by Muhammad II of Khwarazm (1169, 1200-20), ruler of the Khwarazmian Empire, before it fell to the Mongol conquest of Khwarazmia.

References

Central Asia
Archaeology of Uzbekistan
Archaeological sites in Uzbekistan
Former populated places in Uzbekistan
Kushan Empire